Johannes Heer of Glarus (1489–1553) was a song composer and copyist, and later minister in the Reformed Church. His Liederbuch, or chansonnier, was copied during his study in Paris. Apart from works by Brumel, Josquin and Senfl, the songbook includes anonymous pieces and works by Heer himself. An edition, Das Liederbuch des Johannes Heer von Glarus, was published as part of the series Schweizerische Musikdenkmaler Basel, 1967. Recordings of selections were made by the Huelgas Ensemble (1977) and the Ludwig Senfl Ensemble (1991).

References

1489 births
1553 deaths
Swiss composers
Swiss male composers
Music copyists